Darwin's Dilemma is a personal computer game released in 1990 for the Macintosh and Sharp X68000 platforms. It was developed by André Ouimet and published by Inline Design.

Darwin's Dilemma is a puzzle game in which the goal is to match creatures together. After enough matches the creatures will "evolve" into new ones, and these new creatures must be again matched so they can evolve, and so on.

References
"Darwin's Dilemma: A Field Guide to Evolution", Andre Ouimet and Anne L. Peck, 2nd Printing - February 1991
"New for Macintosh: Darwin's Dilemma upgrade", Newsbytes News Network, July 9, 1992
"Review of Darwin's Dilemma", Newsbytes News Network, July 22, 1994

External links 
 Home of the Underdogs - Entry: Darwin's Dilemma

1990 video games
FM Towns games
Classic Mac OS games
NEC PC-9801 games
Puzzle video games
X68000 games
Video games developed in the United States